Running Target is a 1956 American Western film directed by Marvin R. Weinstein and written by Marvin R. Weinstein, Jack Couffer and Conrad L. Hall. The film stars Doris Dowling, Arthur Franz, Richard Reeves, Myron Healey and James Parnell. The film was released on November 1, 1956, by United Artists.

Plot
Four fugitives head for the Colorado hills after a prison break. A posse is formed, led by lawman Scott and including a couple of civilians, Jaynes, a bartender who is a marksman with a rifle, and Smitty, a resourceful woman who runs a gas station that the criminals robbed. Smitty brings along a satchel on the hunt.

A man named Kaygo is the outlaw leader and considered the toughest and smartest of the bunch. Jaynes is more obsessed than the others and a bit trigger-happy. Scott tolerates much of his behavior while trying to understand Smitty, discovering at one point that her satchel includes a pink dress.

After the others are accounted for, Kaygo is the only one left. Scott wakes in the middle of the night and sees Kaygo looking at him, but doesn't try to shoot him.  The searchers go separate ways and Scott suddenly spots Smitty in her dress, romping with Kaygo in a field, obviously in love. He takes aim to shoot, then changes his mind and orders the prisoner to surrender. Jaynes, uphill from Scott, shoots Kaygo and doesn't understand why Scott and Smitty are distraught.  Scott smashes Jaynes' beloved rifle and walks off hugging Smitty.

Cast 
Doris Dowling as Smitty
Arthur Franz as Scott
Richard Reeves as Jaynes
Myron Healey as Kaygo
James Parnell as Pryor
Charles Delaney as Barker
James K Anderson as Strothers
Gene Roth as Holesworth
Frank Richards as Castagna

See also 
 Running target shooting

References

External links 
 

1956 films
Films scored by Ernest Gold
United Artists films
American Western (genre) films
1956 Western (genre) films
1950s English-language films
1950s American films